Eric Mezzalira (born March 10, 1994) is a professional Canadian football linebacker who is a free agent. He was most recently a member of the Montreal Alouettes of the Canadian Football League (CFL).

University career
Mezzalira played U Sports football for the McMaster Marauders from 2014 to 2017.

Professional career

Calgary Stampeders
Mezzalira was selected to the Ontario Regional Combine where he earned an invitation to the CFL National Combine. He scored the highest result on the Wonderlic at the combine. Mezzalira was drafted in the second round, 17th overall, by the Calgary Stampeders in the 2018 CFL Draft and signed with the team on May 14, 2018. He dressed in his first professional game in the team's 2018 season opener on June 16, 2018 against the Hamilton Tiger-Cats. In total, he dressed in 14 regular season games in 2018 where he recorded five special teams tackles. Mezzalira also played in both post-season games, including in the 106th Grey Cup where he had one special teams tackle in the victory over the Ottawa Redblacks.

His 2019 season was beset by injury as he only played in eight regular season games and one playoff game where he had six special teams tackles and one forced fumble. He did not play in 2020 due to the cancellation of the 2020 CFL season and he became a free agent upon the expiration of his rookie contract on February 9, 2021.

Toronto Argonauts
On June 30, 2021, Mezzalira signed with the Toronto Argonauts. He spent the entire year on the practice roster and his contract expired on December 6, 2021.

Winnipeg Blue Bombers
On April 11, 2022, Mezzalira was signed by the Winnipeg Blue Bombers. However, he was released with the final training camp cuts on June 5, 2022.

Montreal Alouettes
On July 31, 2022, it was announced that Mezzalira had signed a practice roster agreement with the Montreal Alouettes. However, he was recently shortly after on August 5, 2022.

References

External links
 Montreal Alouettes bio
 

1994 births
Living people
Calgary Stampeders players
Canadian football linebackers
McMaster Marauders football players
Montreal Alouettes players
Players of Canadian football from Ontario
Sportspeople from Hamilton, Ontario
Toronto Argonauts players
Winnipeg Blue Bombers players